Noble Consort Xun (29 October 1758 – 10 January 1798), of the Manchu Bordered Blue Banner Irgen Gioro clan, was a consort of the Qianlong Emperor. She was 47 years his junior.

Life

Family background
Noble Consort Xun's personal name was not recorded in history.

 Father: Guilin, served as the Viceroy of Liangguang from 1778–1780
 Paternal grandfather: Henian (d. 1758), served as the Viceroy of Liangguang from 1757–1758

Qianlong era
The future Noble Consort Xun was born on the 28th day of the ninth lunar month in the 23rd year of the reign of the Qianlong Emperor, which translates to 29 October 1758 in the Gregorian calendar.

On 28 December 1776, Lady Irgen Gioro entered the Forbidden City and was granted the title "Concubine Xun" by the Qianlong Emperor. It is not known when she was demoted to "Noble Lady". On 14 November 1779, she was restored as "Concubine Xun". In December 1794 or January 1795, she was elevated to "Consort Xun".

Jiaqing era
Lady Irgen Gioro died on 10 January 1798 during the reign of the Jiaqing Emperor, the Qianlong Emperor's 15th son. The Jiaqing Emperor posthumously elevated her to "Noble Consort Xun" and arranged for her a funeral befitting that of a Noble Consort.

Titles
 During the reign of the Qianlong Emperor (r. 1735–1796):
 Lady Irgen Gioro (from 29 October 1758)
 Concubine Xun (from 28 December 1776), fifth rank consort
 Concubine Xun (from 14 November 1779), fifth rank consort
 Consort Xun (from December 1794 or January 1795), fourth rank consort
 During the reign of the Jiaqing Emperor (r. 1796–1820):
 Noble Consort Xun (from 9 October 1799), third rank consort

See also
 Ranks of imperial consorts in China#Qing
 Royal and noble ranks of the Qing dynasty

Notes

References
 

1758 births
1798 deaths
Consorts of the Qianlong Emperor
Manchu people
Irgen Gioro